The Star of People's Friendship,  Star of Nations' Friendship, was an order awarded by the German Democratic Republic (GDR). 

Established 20 August 1959, it was given to individuals of exceptional merit who had contributed to the "understanding and friendship between nations and preservation of peace".

The Star of People's Friendship was given in three classes:

1st Class – Grand Star of People's Friendship
2nd Class – Star of People's Friendship in Gold
3rd class – Star of People's Friendship in Silver.

It was awarded on the recommendation of the presidency of the Council of Ministers via the chairman of the Council of State or in its name.

The medal was awarded with a certificate.

Notable recipients

See also
Awards and decorations of East Germany

References 

Taschenlexikon Orden und Medaillen Staatliche Auszeichnungen der DDR, VEB Bibliographisches Institute, Leipzig, 1983

Orders, decorations, and medals of East Germany
Awards established in 1959
Awards disestablished in 1989
1959 establishments in East Germany
1989 disestablishments in East Germany
Peace awards